The Roman Catholic Diocese of Kasana–Luweero is a diocese located in the cities of Kasana and Luweero in the Ecclesiastical province of Kampala in Uganda.

History
 30 November 1996: Established as Diocese of Kasana – Luweero from the Metropolitan Archdiocese of Kampala.

Leadership
 Bishops of Kasana–Luweero (Latin Church)
 Bishop Cyprian Kizito Lwanga (30 November 1996 – 19 August 2006), appointed Archbishop of Kampala 
 Bishop Paul Ssemogerere (19 August 2008 – 9 December 2021. Appointed Archbishop of Kampala.

See also
Roman Catholicism in Uganda
Luweero

References

External links
 GCatholic.org
 Catholic Hierarchy

Roman Catholic dioceses in Uganda
Christian organizations established in 1996
Roman Catholic dioceses and prelatures established in the 20th century
Luweero District
Roman Catholic Ecclesiastical Province of Kampala
Roman Catholic bishops of Kasana–Luweero